Justice Austin may refer to:

Aaron Austin (1745–1829), judge of the Connecticut Supreme Court of Errors
Benjamin H. Austin (1832–1885), associate justice of the Supreme Court of the Kingdom of Hawaii
James W. Austin (1829–1895), associate justice of the Supreme Court of the Kingdom of Hawaii